Carinastele niceterium is a species of sea snail, a marine gastropod mollusk in the family Calliostomatidae.

Description
(Original description by Hedley & May) The height of the shell attains 7 mm. The thin, imperforate shell has a conical-turbinate shape. Its colour uniform is pale cream and of silken lustre. The shell contains 5½ whorl, including a small pointed obliquely set protoconch of 1½ whorl.

Sculpture : prominent spiral keels, three to the penultimate, ten to the body whorl, successively diminishing from the suture to the base. They are undercut below the narrow summit, parted by much broader flat interstices. These keels, apparently folds in the shell substance, are microscopically beaded by fine radial striae, represented in the interstices as hair lines. The protoconch does not share the adult sculpture, but is minutely malleated. The oblique aperture is subcircular. The glazed columella is arched, running out to a spur. The outer lip is unfinished, the ends of the ribs projecting beyond the interstices like claws. In the throat a furrow corresponds to each external keel.

Distribution

References

 Marshall B.A. (1988) Thysanodontinae: A new subfamily of the Trochidae (Gastropoda). Journal of Molluscan Studies 54: 215–229

External links

niceterium
Gastropods described in 1908